Magdalena de Saint-Jean (born 7 January 1970) is a French former racing cyclist. She finished in third place at the French national road race in 2011.

References

External links

1970 births
Living people
French female cyclists
Polish emigrants to France
Cyclists from Marseille
Sportspeople from Opole